College Square Mall (Iowa), a shopping mall in Cedar Falls, Iowa
 College Square Mall (Tennessee), a shopping mall in Morristown, Tennessee
 College Square (Ottawa), a shopping centre in Ottawa, Ontario